John Taylor Collegiate is a public high school in Winnipeg, Manitoba, Canada. It is part of the St. James-Assiniboia School Division and is located at 470 Hamilton Avenue, in the Crestview area of Winnipeg. The school was founded in 1964  and commenced construction March 1964 with a proposal had a budget of $984,000. The architectural firm of Herman and St. Lawrence  was hired and the school was named after a colonial settler of the area of the same name.

Notable alumni
 Recording Artist Bif Naked aka Beth Torbert. Class of 1987.
 Recording Artist Brent Fitz Class of 1988.
 Canadian astronaut Robert Thirsk

References

External links
 

High schools in Winnipeg
Educational institutions established in 1964
1964 establishments in Manitoba
St. James, Winnipeg